Willsmere was a railway station on the Outer Circle railway line, located in the suburb of Kew, Melbourne, Australia. The station was named after the estate of early Kew settlers H.S. and Thomas Wills. Willsmere was opened with the line in 1891 and closed with it in 1893.

Although on a single line, the station had two side platforms, with one being on a crossing loop. The station platforms and buildings are believed to have been removed around 1930.

References

External links
 Photographs of the site of Willsmere Station

Railway stations in Australia opened in 1891
Railway stations closed in 1893
Disused railway stations in Melbourne